The Spanish Colonial Revival Style is an architectural stylistic movement arising in the early 20th century based on the Spanish Colonial architecture of the Spanish colonization of the Americas.

In the United States, the Panama-California Exposition of 1915 in San Diego, highlighting the work of architect Bertram Goodhue, is credited with giving the style national exposure. Embraced principally in California and Florida, the Spanish Colonial Revival movement enjoyed its greatest popularity between 1915 and 1931.

In Mexico, the Spanish Colonial Revival in architecture was tied to the nationalist movement in arts encouraged by the post-Mexican Revolution government. The Mexican style was primarily influenced by the Baroque architecture of central New Spain, in contrast to the U.S. style which was primarily influenced by the northern missions of New Spain. Subsequently, the U.S. interpretation saw popularity in Mexico and was locally termed colonial californiano.

Today, tract home design in Southern California and Florida largely descends from the early movement. The iconic terracotta shingles and stucco walls have been standard design of new construction in these regions from the 1970s to present.

Development of style

Mediterranean Revival

The antecedents of the Spanish Colonial Revival Style in the United States can be traced to the Mediterranean Revival architectural style. For St. Augustine, Florida (a former Spanish colony), three northeastern architects, New Yorkers John Carrère and Thomas Hastings of Carrère and Hastings and Bostonian Franklin W. Smith, designed grand, elaborately detailed hotels in the Mediterranean Revival and Spanish Revival styles in the 1880s. With the advent of the Ponce de Leon Hotel (Carrère and Hastings, 1882), the Alcazar Hotel (Carrère and Hastings, 1887) and the Casa Monica Hotel (later Hotel Cordova) (Franklin W. Smith, 1888) thousands of winter visitors to 'the Sunshine State' began to experience the charm and romance of Spanish influenced architecture. These three hotels were influenced not only by the centuries-old buildings remaining from the Spanish rule in St. Augustine but also by The Old City House, constructed in 1873 and still standing, an excellent example of early Spanish Colonial Revival architecture.

Mission Revival

The possibilities of the Spanish Colonial Revival Style were brought to the attention of architects attending late 19th and early 20th centuries international expositions. For example, California's Mission Revival style Pavilion in white stucco at the World's Columbian Exposition of 1893 in Chicago, and the Mission Inn, along with the Electric Tower of the Pan-American Exposition in Buffalo in 1900 introduced the potential of Spanish Colonial Revival. They also integrated porticoes, pediments and colonnades influenced by Beaux Arts classicism as well.

Florida

By the early years of the 1910s, architects in Florida had begun to work in a Spanish Colonial Revival style. Frederick H. Trimble's Farmer's Bank in Vero Beach, completed in 1914, is a fully mature early example of the style. The city of St. Cloud, Florida, espoused the style both for homes and commercial structures and has a fine collection of subtle stucco buildings reminiscent of colonial Mexico. Many of these were designed by architectural partners Ida Annah Ryan and Isabel Roberts. Another significant example of the emerging popularity of Spanish Colonial Revival can be seen in the architecture of south Florida's Coral Gables, a planned city established in the 1920s that prominently incorporates the style.

California

The major location of design and construction in the Spanish Colonial Revival style was California, especially in the coastal cities. In 1915 the San Diego Panama-California Exposition, with architects Bertram Goodhue and Carleton Winslow Sr., popularized the style in the state and nation. It is best exemplified in the California Quadrangle, built as the grand entrance to that Exposition. In the early 1920s, architect Lilian Jeannette Rice designed the style in the development of the town of Rancho Santa Fe in San Diego County. The city of Santa Barbara adopted the style to give it a unified Spanish character after widespread destruction in the 1925 Santa Barbara earthquake. The County Courthouse designed by William Mooser III and the Arlington Theatre designed by Edwards and Plunkett are prime examples. Real estate developer Ole Hanson favored the Spanish Colonial Revival style in his founding and development of San Clemente, California in 1928. Between 1922 and 1931, architect Robert H. Spurgeon constructed 32 Spanish colonial revival houses in Riverside and many of them have been preserved.

Mexico

 The Spanish Colonial Revival of Mexico has a distinct origin from the style developed in the United States. Following the Mexican Revolution, there was a wave of nationalism that emphasized national culture, including in architecture. The neocolonial style arose as a response to European eclecticism (favored during the Porfiriato). The 1915 book La patria y la arquitectura nacional by architect Federico E. Mariscal (es) was influential in advocating viceregal architecture as integral to national identity. During the government of President Venustiano Carranza (serving 1917 to 1920), tax exemptions were offered to those that built houses in a colonial style. In the early 1920s there was a surge of houses built with Plateresque elements; such as grotesques, pinnacles and mixtilinear arches (es).

Secretary of Education José Vasconcelos (who shaped the cultural philosophy of the post-Revolution government) was an active promoter of neocolonial architecture.  Traditional materials such as tezontle, cantera and Talavera tiles were incorporated into neocolonial buildings.

The colonial-era National Palace was significantly altered between 1926 and 1929: the addition of a third floor and changes to the facade. The modifications were done in a manner corresponding to the original style. Similarly, the colonial Mexico City government building was remodeled in the 1920s and a neocolonial companion building was built in the 1940s.

Colonial californiano
The style, as developed in the United States, came full circle to its geographic point of inspiration as in the late 1930s, single-family houses were built in Mexico City's then-new upscale neighborhoods in what is known in Mexico as colonial californiano (Californian Colonial). That is, a Mexican reinterpretation of the California interpretation of Spanish Colonial Revival. Many houses of this style can still be seen in the Colonia Nápoles, Condesa, Polanco and Lomas de Chapultepec areas of Mexico City. The Pasaje Polanco shopping court is an example of the style's application in commercial architecture.

Australia
Influential Australian architects such as Emil Sodersten and Professor Leslie Wilkinson brought back styles from Italy and Spain in the early 20th century convinced that Mediterranean styles would be well-suited for the Australian climate and lifestyle. Mediterranean style became popular in places like Sydney suburbs Manly and Bondi in the 1920s and 1930s. One variant, known as Spanish Mission or Hollywood Spanish, became popular as Australians saw films of and read in magazines about the glamorous mansions in that style that Hollywood movie stars had. Spanish mission houses began to appear in the wealthier suburbs, the most famous being Boomerang, at Elizabeth Bay. The Plaza Theatre in Sydney is a celebrated cinema in the style.

China
In the 1930s, numerous houses in Spanish Revival style were built in Shanghai, particularly in the former French Concession. Although Shanghai was not culturally linked to the Spanish-speaking world, these buildings were probably inspired by Hollywood movies, which were highly influential in the city at the time. Local architectural magazines of the period like The Chinese Architect and The Builder regularly printed detailed examples of the style for local builders to copy and implement.

Spanish East Indies

After being conquered and ruled for the Spanish crown, and for the most part being administered as a territory under the jurisdiction of the kingdom of New Spain (Mexico), the Philippines and Mariana islands received Iberian and Latin-American influences in its architecture. By the time the United States occupied the Philippines, the Mission-style and Spanish Colonial Revival architecture also arrived, with inspirations from California. American architects further developed this style in the Philippines, modernizing the buildings with American amenities.

The best example of the Spanish Colonial Revival architecture and California mission style is the famed Manila Hotel designed by William E. Parsons and built in 1909. Other examples exist throughout the country such as Gota de Leche, Paco Market, and thousands more, especially in the churches and cathedrals throughout the country.

Design elements

Spanish Colonial Revival architecture shares some elements with the earlier Mission Revival style derived from the architecture of the California missions, and Pueblo Revival style from the traditional Puebloan peoples in New Mexico. Both precedents were popularized in the Western United States by the Fred Harvey and his Atchison, Topeka and Santa Fe Railway Depots and Hotels. The Spanish Colonial Revival style is also influenced by the American Craftsman style and Arts and Crafts Movement.

Spanish Colonial Revival architecture is characterized by a combination of detail from several eras of Spanish Baroque, Spanish Colonial, Moorish Revival and Mexican Churrigueresque architecture. The style is marked by the prodigious use of smooth plaster (stucco) wall and chimney finishes, low-pitched clay tile, shed, or flat roofs, and terracotta or cast concrete ornaments. Other characteristics typically include small porches or balconies, Roman or semi-circular arcades and fenestration, wood casement or tall, double–hung windows, canvas awnings, and decorative iron trim.

Structural form:
 Rectangular, courtyard, or L-plan.
 Horizontal massing.
 Predominantly one-story.
 Interior or exterior courtyards.
 Asymmetrical shape with cross-gables and side wings.

Notable architects
One of the most accomplished architects of the style was George Washington Smith who practiced during the 1920s in Santa Barbara, California. His own residences El Hogar (1916, a.k.a. Casa Dracaena) and Casa del Greco (1920) brought him commissions from local society in Montecito and Santa Barbara. An example landmark house he designed is the Steedman estate Casa del Herrero in Montecito, now a registered National Historic Landmark and restored historic house—landscape museum. Other examples are the Jackling House and Lobero Theatre also in California.

In California

Bertram Goodhue and Carleton Winslow initiated the style as the dominant historical regional style in California; they also influenced Hawaiian architecture in the 1920s. Notable in Californian architecture were the following architects:
 John Byers, AIA
 Birge Clark, FAIA
 Edwards and Plunkett
 Elmer Grey, AIA
 Sumner P. Hunt, AIA
 Reginald Johnson, FAIA
 William Templeton Johnson, FAIA
 Julia Morgan, AIA (AIA Gold Medalist)
 Wallace Neff, FAIA
 Richard Requa
 Lilian Jeannette Rice, AIA
 Lutah Maria Riggs, FAIA
 Clarence J. Smale
 George Washington Smith
 Robert H. Spurgeon Jr.
 Paul Revere Williams, FAIA (AIA Gold Medalist)
Currently:
 Kevin A. Clark
 Marc Appleton, AIA
 Michael Burch, FAIA
 Thomas Bollay, AIA

In Florida
In Florida notable architects include:
 John Elliot
 Maurice Fatio, AIA
 Harry Griffin, AIA
 Richard Kiehnel, AIA of Kiehnel and Elliott
 Addison Mizner
 Wallace Neff, FAIA
 Albert Pierce
 James Gamble Rogers II, FAIA
 Robert Weed, FAIA
 Marion Wyeth, FAIA

In Hawaii
 Louis Davis
 G. Robert Miller, AIA
 Bertram Goodhue FAIA's junior partner, Hardie Phillip, FAIA

List of example structures

 California Quadrangle and El Prado, Balboa Park, San Diego, California: by Bertram Goodhue, for the Panama–California Exposition (1915-15).
 Casa del Herrero, Montecito, California, architects George Washington Smith and Lutah Maria Riggs, 1926.
 The Main Quad and many buildings in the campus of Stanford University, designed by Frederick Law Olmsted, 1886–1891.
 "Casa Dracaena" (a.k.a. El Hogar or Heberton House), George Washington Smith residence #1, 1916.
 Glendale Southern Pacific Railroad Depot, by Maurice Couchot & Kenneth MacDonald, Jr. in Glendale, California, opened 1923.
 Santa Barbara County Courthouse, by William Mooser III, in Santa Barbara, California, completed 1929.
 George Fearn House in Mobile, Alabama, completed 1904.
 Farmer's Bank in Vero Beach, Florida, completed in 1914.
 Adamson House, "Taj Mahal of Tile" by Stiles O. Clements, in Malibu, California, completed 1930.
 Alice Lynch Residence in Los Angeles, California, completed in 1922
 Marine Corps Recruit Depot, San Diego, California, 1917–1930
 Naval Training Center, San Diego, California, completed 1923 (Buildings 1–26, and Officer's Quarters "A"-"D"). Other phases completed 1936 (Barracks 27–30, Camp Lawrence), and 1942 (Camp Luce).
 Quapaw Baths building in Bathhouse Row, Hot Springs, Arkansas, completed in 1922.
 "Casa de las Campañas" in Hancock Park district, Los Angeles, California, completed in 1928.
 C.E. Toberman Estate, by Russell & Alspagh, in Hollywood, California, completed 1924.
 Frank H. Upham House in Altadena, California, completed 1928.
 Azalea Court Apartments in Mobile, Alabama, completed in 1928.
 "La Casa Nueva", Workman and Temple Family Estate, in City of Industry, California, completed 1927.
 Castillo Serrallés in Ponce, Puerto Rico, completed in the 1930s.
 William S. Hart "La Loma de los Vientos" Ranch, arch. Arthur R. Kelly, Newhall, California, completed in the early 1920s.
 Gaylord Suites in San Francisco, California, completed in 1928.
 Randolph Air Force Base (various structures) near San Antonio, Texas, designed in 1929.
 Hollywood, Homewood, Alabama, a 1926 residential development in Homewood, Alabama.
 El Capitan Theatre, Hollywood, built in 1928.
 "Death Valley Ranch", "Scotty's Castle," a landmark in Death Valley National Park, which was begun in 1922 and had construction on the original design continue sporadically as late as 1943.
 Scripps College, by Gordon Kaufmann and Sumner Hunt, in Claremont, California, women's college and campus established in 1926 by Ellen Browning Scripps.
 Hamilton Air Force Base, in San Francisco Bay Area near Novato, California, completed in 1934.
 Pima County Courthouse in Tucson, Arizona, designed by Roy Place.
 Benedictine Monastery in Tucson, Arizona, also designed by Roy Place. http://www.tucsonmonastery.com/
 Louis P. and Clara K. Best Residence and Auto House, Clausen & Clausen, Davenport, Iowa, constructed in 1909.
 Pasadena City Hall, by Bakewell and Brown, in Pasadena, California, completed 1927.
 Hortonville Community Hall, by Robert Messmer, in Hortonville, Wisconsin, built in 1912.
 Thomas Jefferson Hotel in Birmingham, Alabama, opened in 1929.
 Adler Hotel in Sharon Springs, New York, built in 1928.
 El Reno Municipal Swimming Pool Bath House in El Reno, Oklahoma, completed in 1935.
 Plaza del Lago in Wilmette, Illinois, completed in 1928 by Henry Gage
 Camarillo State Hospital in Camarillo, California, first phase completed in 1936 by State Architect Howard Spencer Hazen, built to completion in 1957. With the hospital's closure in 1997, the site has been redeveloped into California State University Channel Islands (opened in 2002), with all the new college buildings retaining the Spanish Colonial Revival architecture and Mission Revival architecture, except the John Spoor Broome Library--the only modern-style building on campus.
 Antiga Estação Transmissora da Rádio Farroupilha (former Farroupilha Radio Broadcast Station), an example from Porto Alegre, city in far southern Brazil, opened in 1952, closed in 1986.

Gallery

See also
 Mediterranean Revival Style architecture
 Mission Revival Style architecture
 Mar del Plata style - eclectic vernacular architecture from Argentina featuring some Spanish Colonial characteristics
 Revivalism (architecture)
 Ibero-American Exposition of 1929 - several pavilions erected for this event fall under the style
 Category: Spanish Revival architecture
 Spanish Revival architects
 Spanish Colonial Revival architects
 Spanish Colonial Revival architecture in California
 Images of Revival styles of architecture

References
Notes

Further reading 
 Gauvin Alexander Bailey, Art of Colonial Latin America. London: Phaidon Press, 2005.
 Newcomb, Rexford, Mediterranean Domestic Architecture in the United States. Marc Appleton, intro. New York: Acanthus Press, 2000. 
 
 Nolan, David, The Houses of St. Augustine. Sarasota, Pineapple Press, 1995.
 Nylander, Justin A., Casas to Castles: Florida's Historic Mediterranean Revival Architecture. Schiffer, 2010. 
 Mockler, Kim. Maurice Fatio: Palm Beach Architect. New York: Acanthus Press, 2010.

External links

 Colonial Architecture Project with 7,000 pictures of colonial buildings, most of them Spanish

 
American architectural styles
House styles
Revival architectural styles
 
20th-century architectural styles
Addison Mizner